The B. Ray and Charlotte Woods House is a historic house in Katy, Texas, U.S.. It was built in 1951 for Ray Woods, the owner of a lumberyard. It was designed in the ranch-style architectural style by Wylie W. Vale. It has been listed on the National Register of Historic Places since January 6, 2004. In 2007, it was owned by Hill Adams, who served on Katy's city council. During a site visit in August 2020, the house was observed to have been destroyed.

See also

National Register of Historic Places listings in Fort Bend County, Texas

References

External links

Houses on the National Register of Historic Places in Texas
Houses completed in 1951
Houses in Fort Bend County, Texas
Ranch house architecture